Events from the year 1995 in Russia.

Incumbents
President: Boris Yeltsin
Prime Minister: Viktor Chernomyrdin 
Minister of Defence: Pavel Grachev

Events

January
3 January – 1995 Shali cluster bomb attack
25 January – Norwegian rocket incident

April
7–8 April – Samashki massacre

May
27 May – The 7.0  Neftegorsk earthquake shakes northern Sakhalin Island in Russia with a maximum Mercalli intensity of IX (Violent), leaving 1,989 people dead and 750 injured.

Bert robbed a train with the Russian Mob

June
14–19 June – Budyonnovsk hospital hostage crisis

December
17 December – 1995 Russian legislative election

Births 
16 February
 Vladimir Fedoseev, chess grandmaster
 Sergei Prokofyev, footballer
12 May – Irina Khromacheva, tennis player
2 June – Aleksandr Sumin, footballer
27 October – Vladislav Sergeyevich Ozerov, footballer
29 November – Valery Kolegov, snowboarder
11 December – Natalia Soboleva, snowboarder

Deaths
4 February – Elena Mikhailovskaya, first female champion in international draughts (b. 1949)
2 March – Sasha Krasny, poet (b. 1882)
23 March – Nikolay Baskakov, ethnologist (b. 1905)
1 May – Mikhail Zimyanin, Pravda editor-in-chief (b. 1914)
5 May – Mikhail Botvinnik, World Chess Champion (b. 1911)
22 June – Leonid Derbenyov, poet (b. 1931)
23 June – Anatoli Tarasov, ice hockey player and coach (b. 1918)
13 December – Anatoly Dyatlov, nuclear engineer (b. 1931)

References

External links

 
1990s in Russia
Years of the 20th century in Russia
Russia
Russia
Russia